Corticibacterium populi is a Gram-negative, aerobic and motile bacterium from the genus of Corticibacterium which has been isolated from the bark Populus × euramericana.

References

External links
Type strain of Corticibacterium populi at BacDive -  the Bacterial Diversity Metadatabase

Phyllobacteriaceae
Bacteria described in 2016